Degrassi: Next Class is the second incarnation of the Degrassi: The Next Generation series and is a Canadian teen drama television series created by Linda Schuyler, Yan Moore, Stephen Stohn, Sarah Glinski and Matt Huether. In January 2016, it was released on Netflix internationally and currently airs on the new Family Channel teen block, F2N, in Canada. It is the fifth series set in the fictional Degrassi universe created by Schuyler and Kit Hood in 1979. Like its predecessors, Degrassi: Next Class follows a group of students from Degrassi Community School, a fictional school in Toronto, Ontario, and depicts some of the typical issues and challenges common to a teenager's life. Although this series is a continuation of "The Next Generation", Netflix and the producers decided to begin with a "season one", under a new title, instead.

The following is a list of characters who have appeared in the television series.

Appearances

Main characters 
The following actors have all received star billing and are listed as "starring" after the opening theme song of Degrassi: Next Class. 
A regular is an actor who is credited as "starring" after the opening theme song of the show in any given season. Actors are only credited for the episodes for which they appear in. 
A recurring status is given to actors who are not listed as "starring", but appear in two or more episodes of any particular season.
A guest appearance by an actor means they are not credited as "starring", but were a guest star in one episode of the season.

Students

Adults

Alumni Guest stars

References

Degrassi: The Next Generation